Zhuma may refer to:

Zhuma Township, a township in Jinhua, Zhejiang, China
Zhuma, Jiangsu (朱码), a town in Lianshui County, Jiangsu, China